The narrow-tailed white-bellied rat (Niviventer lepturus) is a species of rodent in the family Muridae.
It is found only in Indonesia.

References

Niviventer
Mammals described in 1879
Taxonomy articles created by Polbot